Kani Kan (also Romanized as Kānī Kan and Kānī Kon; also known as Cheshmeh Sefīd, Kāneh Kīn, Khāneh Kīn, Khāneqayn, and Kheymeh Sefīd) is a village in Najafabad Rural District, in the Central District of Bijar County, Kurdistan Province, Iran. At the 2006 census, its population was 223, in 46 families. The village is populated by Kurds.

References 

Towns and villages in Bijar County
Kurdish settlements in Kurdistan Province